Following is a list of Justices of the Michigan Supreme Court.

Current Justices

Chief Justices

Michigan Territory

 Augustus B. Woodward
 Solomon Sibley

Statehood

Elizabeth T. Clement

Former Justices

References

External links
List of justices of the Michigan Supreme Court 1836–2015

Legal history of Michigan
Michigan
Supreme Court Justices